Nico Vergeylen (born 1968) is a retired Belgian para table tennis player who competed in international level events. He was a Paralympic champion, double World silver medalist and six-time European medalist. He has won most of his team titles alongside Marc Ledoux and Mathieu Loicq.

Vergeylen is now a table tennis coach who trains Florian Van Acker.

References

1968 births
Living people
Sportspeople from Sint-Niklaas
Paralympic table tennis players of Belgium
Table tennis players at the 1992 Summer Paralympics
Table tennis players at the 1996 Summer Paralympics
Table tennis players at the 2000 Summer Paralympics
Table tennis players at the 2004 Summer Paralympics
Table tennis players at the 2008 Summer Paralympics
Medalists at the 2004 Summer Paralympics
People from Waasmunster
Belgian male table tennis players